Moshe "Jerry" Beit haLevi (14 November 1912 – 3 February 1997) was an Israeli football player and manager.

Playing career
Jerry played on the field with his brother Avraham. In 1939, during a tour of Australia, Avraham decided to stay in the country and it was the last time that Jerry would see his brother who ended up dying in battle against Japanese forces in New Guinea.

Managerial career

Maccabi Tel Aviv and Israel
After the retirement of Egon Pollack, Beit haLevi took over the reins of the club that made him famous as a player. He built a strong side that was arguably the strongest side in the country. Star players Eli Fuchs, Itzhak Schneor and Shiye Glazer and tough tactics helped Beit haLevi capture two league championships in 1951 and 1952 as well as a double in 1954. He left Maccabi for a brief stint at city rivals Hapoel Tel Aviv before bringing Maccabi another league title in 1956.

During his time with Maccabi, Beit haLevi served two terms as manager of the Israel national team. His bunker tactics led to the national team's style of play being referred to as "Jerry's bunker". After the 1956 season with Maccabi, Beit haLevi was fired, though he returned in the 1960s and is credited with the development of such national team stars such as Giora Spiegel. After retiring from coaching, he served as the chairman for the club.

Nigeria national team
In 1960, Jerry received an offer to coach the Nigerian national football team, which he accepted. In his first match against Ghana, Nigeria lost 3–0 in Lagos. The press called for Beit haLevi to be fired, but members of the Nigeria Football Association (NFA) pushed back against the exceedingly harsh criticism from the press, and Jerry remained in his position.

In November, Jerry recorded his first achievement as Nigeria beat Egypt 2–1. In April 1961, the Israeli coach led the national team to two draws against Ghana. The positive relationship with sportswriters translated into positive coverage of Jerry in most of the Nigerian press from this time onward.

At the end of 1961, Nigeria played against Tunisia in qualifiers for the 1962 Africa Cup of Nations. The first of the two games took place in Lagos on 25 November, ending in a 2–1 victory for the Green Eagles. Sportswriter Bonar Ekanem from the West African Pilot attributed this win to Jerry: "Beit haLevi has done his job. For the first time since his arrival in this country as a coach, I hand him a bouquet of roses" (27 November 1961). He went even further in this praise a few days later: "Hail, Beit Halevi!...where we hitherto had wild and ‘bushman’ soccer, we have now thoroughbred and civilized exchanges with economic of energy and goal certainty" (29 November 1961). The second game was held in Tunisia on 10 December. Beit Halevi was not permitted by the Tunisians to come to the game due to the hostile relations between Israel and Tunisia.

All in all, Jerry led Nigeria to four wins, five draws, and three losses.

During this time he was also heavily involved in trying to exhume the body of his brother for burial in Israel, but was unsuccessful.

Footnotes

1912 births
1997 deaths
20th-century Polish Jews
Israeli footballers
Mandatory Palestine footballers
Mandatory Palestine international footballers
Maccabi Tel Aviv F.C. players
Israeli football managers
Maccabi Tel Aviv F.C. managers
Hapoel Tel Aviv F.C. managers
Maccabi Netanya F.C. managers
Israel national football team managers
Nigeria national football team managers
Israeli expatriate football managers
Expatriate football managers in Nigeria
Burials at Kiryat Shaul Cemetery
Sportspeople from Łódź
People from Piotrków Governorate
Jews from the Russian Empire
Association football midfielders
Polish emigrants to Mandatory Palestine